Cibecs, founded in 2004, is a company located in Johannesburg, South Africa.
Cibecs develops enterprise endpoint data backup, protection and security software. The company was co-founded by Richard Dewing, Neal Dewing and Ilze Dewing.

In early 2016 Cibecs released Cibecs Version 8.0, their latest data backup and recovery software for laptops and desktops. In 2016 Cibecs extended its offering in South Africa with a cloud based endpoint data backup and protection solution called Cibecs Cloud.

Investment & Partnerships
In December 2008 Hasso Plattner Ventures Africa, personal investment vehicle of Prof. Dr. Hasso Plattner, co-founder of SAP, acquired a stake in Cibecs.
   
In 2009 Cibecs partnered with JSE Limited listed managed services enterprise Gijima in a deal worth in excess of $30 Million.

References

Further reading

 “Cibecs CEO Among 15 High-Impact Entrepreneurs,” 11/23/10) 
 “Unisys Africa partners with Cibecs to tackle data protection”, 10/09/06 

South African companies established in 2004
Software companies established in 2004